Chief marshal of the aviation Konstantin Andreevich Vershinin (3 June 1900 – 30 December 1973) was commander-in-chief of the Soviet Air Force from 1946 to 1949 and from 1957 to 1969.

He was commander of the 4th Air Army in World War II, and for his actions, he was awarded the distinction of Hero of the Soviet Union in 1944. At the outbreak of the Bolshevik Revolution, he left his work in a sawmill to enter the Red Army. In 1929, he was sent to the Zhukovsky Air Force Academy located in Moscow.

In 1946 — as Commander-in-chief of Air Force — Deputy Ministry of Defence of the USSR. He supervised the Air Force transition to the jet era. He was promoted to Marshal of Aviation (3 July 1946).

In September 1949 unexpectedly lowed in grade and appointed chief commander of Baku PVO Region. He was commander of the 14th Air Army in the Ukrainian SSR from February to September 1950. From June 1953 until May 1954 - commander PVO Forces. He served as Commander of the Soviet Air Force from January 1957 to 1969 and was a Deputy Minister of Defence of the USSR. On 8 May 1959 he was promoted to Chief Marshal of Aviation. From March 1969 he was an inspector of the Group of Inspectors General of Ministry of Defence of the USSR.

Member of CPSU from 1919. Candidate for TsK KPSS in 1952–1956. Member of TsK KPSS from 1961. Deputy of Supreme Soviet of the Soviet Union II (1946–1950), IV—VII (from 1954) convocations.

Vershinin died after a long illness on December 30, 1973, in Moscow, and was buried at Novodevichy Cemetery.

Awards and decorations
Soviet Union

Foreign

References

Generals.dk
"The Soviet Airforce at war", "Time Life books", p. 142"

1900 births
1973 deaths
People from Kirov Oblast
People from Yaransky Uyezd
Central Committee of the Communist Party of the Soviet Union members
Second convocation members of the Soviet of Nationalities
Fourth convocation members of the Soviet of Nationalities
Fifth convocation members of the Soviet of Nationalities
Sixth convocation members of the Soviet of Nationalities
Seventh convocation members of the Soviet of Nationalities
Soviet Air Force marshals
Heroes of the Soviet Union
Recipients of the Order of Lenin
Recipients of the Order of the Red Banner
Recipients of the Order of Suvorov, 1st class
Recipients of the Order of Suvorov, 2nd class
Commanders of the Virtuti Militari
Recipients of the Order of the Cross of Grunwald, 1st class